Flow la Discoteka is first album by DJ Nelson released in october 12 of 2004. It was nominated for a Lo Nuestro Award for Urban Album of the Year.

Track listing 
 "Cochiniar" (by Cochinola) - 3:36
 "Tú No Tienes Miedo" (by Daddy Yankee & Ivy Queen) - 1:20
 "Yo Voy a Llegar" (by Zion) - 3:45
 "Que No Pare el Bailoteo" (by Master Joe & O.G. Black) - 2:28
 "Noche de Travesura" (by Héctor el Father & Divino) - 3:32
 "Hay Algo en Tra (Instrumental Mix)" (Various Artists) - 3:13
 "Vente Vamos a Bellakear" (by Las Guanábanas) - 3:09
 "¿Qué Es Lo Que Quiere?" (by Tempo) - 1:58
 "No Me Compares" (by Zion & Lennox) - 3:29
 "Nos Fuimos Hasta Abajo" (by Daddy Yankee) - 1:22
 "Ella Es de la Calle" (by Joan & O'Neil) - 2:43
 "Perreando Mix" (Various Artists) - 3:49
 "Hace Tiempo" (by Wibal & Alex) - 2:49
 "Americano (Loco Mix)" (Various Artists) - 2:20
 "Hasta Que Amanezca" (by Chanteli) - 2:57
 "Mami Tú Quiere" (by Andy Boy) - 3:09
 "Aquí Llegó La Que Le Mete Flow" (by K-Mil) - 2:58
 "Muévelo Mix" (Various Artists) - 2:33
 "Cuando Mi Perra" (by Ivy Queen) - 2:12
 "Yo Voy a Llegar" (by Zion) - 3:59
 "Noche" (by Micky & Tomm) - 2:27
 "American (Interlude) (Live)" (Various Artists) - 2:46
 "Tengo un Problema" (by El Calvo) - 3:08
 "Estamos en Baja" (by Nano MC) - 2:48
 "Y Escápate" (by Aldo & Nnadi) - 3:25

References 

2004 compilation albums
Albums produced by Luny Tunes
Albums produced by Noriega
Albums produced by Rafy Mercenario